Mjosundvatnet is a lake in the municipalities of Namsos and Nærøysund in Trøndelag county, Norway. The  lake lies in the far northern part of Namsos, and it extends a short distance into Nærøysund on both ends. The lake is accessible by road from Salsbruket in Nærøysund.

See also
List of lakes in Norway

References

Namsos
Nærøysund
Lakes of Trøndelag